The 2015–16 Copa de la Reina de Balonmano was the 37th edition of the Copa de la Reina de Balonmano. The tournament began in November 2015 with First round matches, following Second round to finish with the Final8.

The Final8 took place in O Porriño, Galicia, from 15 to 17 April. The matches will be played at Pavillón Polideportivo de Porriño, with 2,500 capacity seating. It was hosted by Federación Galega de Balonmán, Xunta de Galicia, O Porriño concello & RFEBM. O Porriño hosted Copa de la Reina for the last time in 2013.

Bera Bera won its fifth title after defeating newcomer's Prosetecnisa Zuazo in the Final 33–17.

Calendar

First round

|}

Second round

|}

Final eight

Venue

Matches

Quarter-finals

Semifinals

Final

Top goalscorers (Final8)

Source: own compilation

See also
2015–16 División de Honor Femenina de Balonmano

References

External links
Official website
Copa de la Reina at rfebm.net

Copa de la Reina de Balonmano
Copa